The 500 metres distance for men in the 2011–12 ISU Speed Skating World Cup was contested over 12 races on six occasions, out of a total of seven World Cup occasions for the season, with the first occasion taking place in Chelyabinsk, Russia, on 18–20 November 2011, and the final occasion taking place in Berlin, Germany, on 9–11 March 2012.

Mo Tae-bum of South Korea won the cup, while Pekka Koskela of Finland came second, and Tucker Fredricks of the United States came third. Defending champion Lee Kang-seok of South Korea finished in 11th place.

Top three

Race medallists

Standings 
Standings as of 11 March 2012 (end of the season).

References 

Men 0500